Hadiya Hossana Football Club (Amharic: ሀዲያ ሆሳዕና እግር ኳስ ክለብ) is a professional Ethiopian football club based in Hosaena. They currently play in the Ethiopian Premier League, the first division of football in Ethiopia.

History 
The club was founded in 2006 (1998 E.C.). Prior to the start of the 2018-19 season the club announced Girma Tadesse, previously the manager of Debub Police, as their new Manager.

In the 2016-17 season, Hadiya Hossana finished second in group B of the Ethiopian Higher League gaining 53 points in the process. This earned them a spot in a playoff game against Mekelle City FC, the runners up in group A of the Higher League, with the winner being the third and final club promoted to the Ethiopian Premier League that season. The playoff game was held at a neutral site in Dire Dawa city and finished 2-1 in favor of Mekelle City meaning Hadiya Hossana would stay in Higher League.

The club had an impressive start to its 2020-21 season, winning its first 4 games of the season.

Stadium 
Hadiya Hossana play their home matches at Abiy Hersamo Memorial Stadium.

Players

First-team squad 
As of 6 January 2021

Club Officials

Coaching Staff 
Manager/Head coach:  Ashenafi Bekele

Assistant Coach:  Iyasu Merhatsidk

Team Leader:  Melkamu Tsegaye

Team Medic:  Tamre Hundito 

Physiotherapist:  Benyam Tefera

Former Managers 
 Paulos Getachew
Girma Tadesse

References

Football clubs in Ethiopia
Sport in the Southern Nations, Nationalities, and Peoples' Region